Lewenstein is a Yiddish-language surname.  

Notable people with the name include:

Maciej Lewenstein, Polish theoretical physicist
Moshe Yaakov Kopel HaLevi Lewenstein, German rabbi and writer
Oscar Lewenstein, British theatre and film producer

See also
Levenstein, a surname, including a list of people with the name
Lowenstein (surname), including a list of people with the name

Yiddish-language surnames